De Economist, Netherlands Economic Review is a quarterly peer-reviewed academic journal of economics published by Springer Science+Business Media on behalf of the Royal Netherlands Economic Association. It was established in 1852. It publishes theoretical and applied studies, preferably with a focus on European affairs. Originally published in Dutch, the majority of articles are nowadays in English.

External links

Economics journals
Quarterly journals